Vannali is a village in Srikakulam district of Andhra Pradesh, India. Nearer to Rajam and Palakonda of the District.

References

Villages in Srikakulam district